Janetaescincus is a genus of burrowing skinks (family Scincidae) endemic to the Seychelles.

Etymology
The generic name, Janetaescincus, is in honor of Janet Greer, who is the younger of the two sisters of Australian herpetologist Allen E. Greer.

Taxonomy
The genus Janetaescincus is usually placed in the subfamily Scincinae, which seems to be paraphyletic however. Probably quite close to Pamelaescincus gardineri, the genus Janetaescincus belongs to a major clade which does not seem to include the type genus Scincus. Thus, Janetaescincus will probably be eventually assigned to a new, yet-to-be-named subfamily. (Austin & Arnold 2006)

Species
Two species are recognized as being valid.

Janetaescincus braueri 
Janetaescincus veseyfitzgeraldi 

Nota bene: A binomial authority in parentheses indicates that the species was originally described in a genus other than Janetaescincus.

References

Further reading
  (2006). Using ancient and recent DNA to explore relationships of extinct and endangered Leiolopisma skinks (Reptilia: Scincidae) in the Mascarene islands. Molecular Phylogenetics and Evolution 39 (2): 503–511.  (HTML abstract)
  (1970). The Systematics and Evolution of the Subsaharan Africa, Seychelles, and Mauritius Scincine Scincid Lizards. Bull. Mus. Comp. Zool., Harvard College 140 (1): 1-24. (Janetaescincus, new genus, p. 18).

External links
  Monitoring and conservation of Seychelles reptiles and amphibians

Janetaescincus
Lizard genera
Taxa named by Allen Eddy Greer